Hans Adlhoch  (29 January 1883 in Straubing, Lower Bavaria – 21 May 1945 in Munich) was a German politician, representative of the Bavarian People's Party. He was a member of the City Council at Augsburg, and from January–March 1933 was Reichstag deputy. He was imprisoned at Dachau concentration camp on 21 September 1944 in his connection with the 20 July Plot 
to assassinate Adolf Hitler. He died shortly after the camp's liberation in a Munich hospital. He is commemorated in the Memorial to the Murdered Members of the Reichstag at Berlin, Germany.

See also
List of Bavarian People's Party politicians

1883 births
1945 deaths
People from Straubing
People from the Kingdom of Bavaria
German Roman Catholics
Bavarian People's Party politicians
Members of the Reichstag of the Weimar Republic
German people who died in Dachau concentration camp
Members of the 20 July plot
Resistance members who died in Nazi concentration camps
Politicians who died in Nazi concentration camps